

O

O